Farid Uddin Ahmed is a Bangladeshi academic and vice-chancellor of Shahjalal University of Science and Technology.

Education and career
Ahmed completed his master's degree in economics degree from Monash University. He had served as a professor of the department of economics and the dean of faculty of social sciences at the University of Dhaka.

Career 
Ahmed was the former president of the Federation of Bangladesh University Teacher's Association (FBUTA).

On 17 August 2017, Ahmed was appointed vice chancellor of Shahjalal University of Science and Technology. He previously served as the dean of the Faculty of Social Sciences at the University of Dhaka. He was reappointed on 30 June 2021.

Controversies 
On 16 January 2022, Bangladesh Chhatra League, student wing of Awami League, attacked the students of Shahjalal University of Science and Technology who were protesting for the removal of Sirajunnesa Chowdhury hall provost Zafrin Ahmed Liza. On 17 January 2022, a group of students started a protest and he was locked at the IICT building for 3 long hours by students. Later he called police and police brought him out from the home by using force against protesters. Later students, started another phase of movement and demanded resignation from him. Around 30 students were critically injured in police action. The students demanded Ahmed resignation for the police attack and 24 students went on hunger strike until death on 19 January 2022.

References

Living people
Academic staff of the University of Dhaka
University of Dhaka alumni
Monash University alumni
Vice-Chancellors of Shahjalal University of Science and Technology
Year of birth missing (living people)